Terri Brooks (September 13, 1958 – February 4, 1984) was the night manager of a Roy Rogers in Bucks County, Pennsylvania when she was murdered in 1984 by her boyfriend Alfred Scott Keefe, who subsequently confessed. Her murder was not solved until 1999. On June 6, 2000, Keefe was sentenced to life in prison without the possibility of parole.

Brooks' murder was featured in Michael Capuzzo's The Murder Room, which profiled the Vidocq Society.

The case was covered in many true crime shows, such as: Cold Case Files, The New Detectives, Dead of Night, An Unexpected Killer and Mr Ballen Podcast.

References

1984 murders in the United States
Attacks on restaurants in North America
February 1984 events in the United States
Female murder victims
Murder in Pennsylvania